Jean-Marc Lanthier (born March 27, 1963) is a Canadian former professional ice hockey player who spent parts of four seasons in the National Hockey League for the Vancouver Canucks during the mid-1980s. He also played several years in the minor American Hockey League, and retired in 1990.

Biography
Lanthier was born in Montreal, Quebec. As a youth, he played in the 1976 Quebec International Pee-Wee Hockey Tournament with a minor ice hockey team from Montreal.

A gifted junior scorer, Lanthier was selected in the third round (52nd overall) of the 1981 Entry Draft by the Canucks. In his last two junior seasons with the Laval Voisins, he was a linemate of a young Mario Lemieux. He turned pro in 1983, spending most of the 1983–84 season in the AHL, where he notched 25 goals in 60 games for the Fredericton Express. He also earned an 11-game callup to the Canucks, highlighted by scoring his first two NHL goals in his hometown of Montreal on February 9, 1984.

Lanthier continued to produce well in the AHL in 1984–85, earning another 27 games with the Canucks, in which he scored 6 goals and 10 points. He was given an opportunity to play full-time for the Canucks in 1985–86, appearing in a career-high 62 games. However, for a skill player his production proved somewhat disappointing as he recorded just 7 goals and 17 points. For 1986–87, he found himself back in the AHL, and suffered through a miserable year in which he recorded just 15 goals and failed to see any NHL action. He would rebound in 1987–88 with a monster year in the AHL, finishing 2nd in the league with totals of 71 assists and 106 points. His strong play earned him another call-up to Vancouver, where he recorded a goal and an assist in 5 games.

In the summer of 1988, Lanthier signed as a free agent with the Boston Bruins. However, he spent only a few months in that organization before being dealt to the New Jersey Devils. He spent the final two seasons of his career with the Utica Devils, New Jersey's AHL farm team, before retiring in 1990.

Lanthier finished his career with 16 goals and 16 assists for 32 points in 105 NHL games, all with the Vancouver Canucks, along with 29 penalty minutes.

Career statistics

Regular season and playoffs

References

External links

Profile at hockeydraftcentral.com

1963 births
Canadian ice hockey right wingers
Fredericton Express players
French Quebecers
Ice hockey people from Montreal
Laval Voisins players
Living people
Quebec Remparts players
Sorel Éperviers players
Utica Devils players
Vancouver Canucks draft picks
Vancouver Canucks players